Khadija Umar (born 29 August 1975) is a Pakistani politician who was a member of Provincial Assembly of the Punjab from 2002 to present.

Early life and education
She was born on 29 August 1975 in Rawalpindi.

She graduated in 1998 from Marghzar College, Gujrat  and has the degree of Bachelor of Arts. She obtained a Diploma in Interior Designing  from the National College of Arts in 2000.

Political career

She was elected to the Provincial Assembly of the Punjab as a candidate of Pakistan Muslim League (Q) (PML-Q) on a reserved seat for women in 2002 Pakistani general election. She was the youngest female MPA. 

She was re-elected to the Provincial Assembly of the Punjab as a candidate of PML-Q on a reserved seat for women in 2008 Pakistani general election.

She was re-elected to the Provincial Assembly of the Punjab as a candidate of PML-Q on a reserved seat for women in 2014.

She was re-elected to the Provincial Assembly of the Punjab as a candidate of PML-Q on a reserved seat for women in 2018 Pakistani general election.

On 21 February 2023, after the dissolution of the Provincial Assembly, she, along with former Chief Minister Chaudhry Pervaiz Elahi and eight other former PML(Q) MPAs, joined the Pakistan Tehreek-e-Insaf (PTI).

References

1975 births
Living people
Punjab MPAs 2013–2018
Women members of the Provincial Assembly of the Punjab
Pakistan Muslim League (Q) MPAs (Punjab)
Punjab MPAs 2008–2013
Punjab MPAs 2002–2007
Punjab MPAs 2018–2023
21st-century Pakistani women politicians